Pete Latzo (August 1, 1902 – July 7, 1968) was an American boxer who held the World Welterweight Championship from 1926 to 1927.

Boxing career highlights
Latzo was born on August 1, 1902, in Colerain, Pennsylvania, near the heart of coal-mining county.  By several accounts, Latzo spent some of his early years mining, and working as a "breaker boy" whose primary job was to pick slate and other impurities from anthracite coal.  His brother Steve preceded him as a boxer in local rings with some success, once losing to Mickey Walker by knockout.  His older brother Joe also boxed briefly in and around Scranton.  For a period, Latzo's brother Mike managed his career, though his primary managers were Paddy Mullins, and Jimmy Johnston.

In their first welterweight title fight on March 22, 1923, Mickey Walker defeated Latzo in a twelve-round newspapers decision before a crowd of 10,000 in Newark, New Jersey.  Latzo took a tremendous beating, suffering particularly from shots to the body, and was down for a count of three from a solid left to the jaw in the fourth.  Latzo continued to take severe punishment to the body in the sixth but managed to stay on his feet.  With both men exhausted, the fighting in the seventh through eleventh rounds was comparatively slow, and though the twelfth saw more action from both combatants, Latzo was stunned but not floored by a left to the chin shortly before the final bell.

Taking the world welterweight title, May, 1926
In an impressive upset, Latzo defeated Mickey Walker to take the world welterweight championship before a crowd of 12,000 on May 20, 1926, in a ten-round unanimous decision in Scranton, Pennsylvania.  The bout was marred somewhat by frequent clinching, holding and covering up, and it lacked haymakers and knockdowns, but Latzo brilliantly executed his win after previously losing to Walker, a 3-1 favorite to win the match.  The Associated Press gave Latzo five rounds, with three to Walker, and two even, and both judges ruled in his favor.

He defeated Jewish boxer Willie Harmon on June 29, 1926, in a fifth-round knockout in Newark, New Jersey.  If he had lost by knockout, Latzo's recently earned title may have been at risk.  The combatants fought with neither having a strong advantage in the first four rounds.  A strong left to the body that dazed Harmon followed by a solid right to the jaw during infighting in the fifth ended the bout, though Harmon had been down very briefly in the first.  Though he was a sturdy ring veteran, it was Harmon's first loss by knockout.

Latzo fought one of his last defenses of the welterweight title on July 9, 1926, against Georgie Levine, winning in a fourth round disqualification before  a crowd of around 22,000 at New York's Polo Grounds.  After gaining a significant margin on points, Latzo dropped to the canvas in pain.  The referee upheld his claim of being hit by a low blow, 1:28 into the fourth round, ending the bout.

Loss of the world welterweight championship, June, 1927

He lost the welterweight crown to Joe Dundee on June 3, 1927, in a fifteen-round majority decision before one of his largest audiences, an impressive crowd of 30,000, at the New York City's Polo Grounds.  In a fairly decisive win, the Associated Press gave Dundee ten of the fifteen rounds, building his largest points margin in the later rounds.  Latzo started strong, looking best in the first, second, fourth, and twelfth, but took brutal body punishment, particularly to the kidneys, through much of the bout.  By the tenth, gaining confidence and sensing victory, Dundee went to Latzo's head as well as his body with greater frequency.  Several reporters attributed Latzo's lack of endurance in the later rounds to his difficulty making the 147 pound welterweight limit.

Latzo lost to exceptional black boxer Tiger Flowers, former world middleweight champion, on September 30, 1927, in a ten-round unanimous decision at Artillery Park in Wilkes-Barre, Pennsylvania. The crowd of 10,000 saw Flowers take seven rounds, though Latzo performed well in the remaining three, and dominated much of the infighting, particularly in the fifth and sixth when he delivered several close range body rocking blows.  Flowers' dominating the long range fighting was understandable as he had at least a four-inch reach advantage, which required Latzo to gain points inside.

He defeated future world light heavyweight champion Maxie Rosenbloom on February 6, 1928, in a ten-round points decision in Wilkes-Barre, Pennsylvania.  Latzo pulled ahead in the two final rounds in a close bout that ended in a decision unpopular with the crowd.  In a close bout, one judge gave the decision to Rosenbloom, one called it a draw, and the referee decided in favor of Latzo.  On November 21, 1927, Latzo had lost to Rosenbloom in a ten-round split decision at the Arena in Philadelphia.  In a close and very fast bout, Rosenbloom scored well at long range with his straight left and left hook, but at close range, Latzo scored consistently as well.  In the ninth, Rosenbloom delivered a strong blow with his left to Latzo's jaw, and may have won by a shade in the tenth when the fighting was furious.  The bout was a vicious encounter throughout and Rosenbloom bled from a cut over his eye from the seventh round til the finish.

After losing the welter crown Latzo invaded the heavier ranks.  For the duration of his career he fought middleweights, light heavyweights, and even a few quality heavyweights.  Latzo fought many great fighters in his career, including future heavyweight champion Jim Braddock, and middleweight champion Tiger Flowers. He is an inductee of the New Jersey Boxing Hall of Fame.

Challenging for the world light heavyweight title, June–July 1928
Latzo challenged reigning champion Tommy Loughran for the NYSAC world light heavyweight title on June 1, 1928, at Ebbets Field in Brooklyn, but lost in a fifteen-round unanimous decision.  The Associated Press gave eight rounds to Loughran, with only four to Latzo, and one even. Latzo shone in the early rounds catching Loughran on the ropes with occasional blows to both head and body, but failed to faze the light heavyweight champion in the later rounds.

Latzo challenged Loughran again for the light heavyweight title on July 16, 1928, at Artillery Park in Wilkes-Barre, Pennsylvania, but lost in a ten rounds unanimous decision.  In a closer bout than their previous meeting, the Associated Press gave Loughran five rounds, Latzo four, and one even.  In the third and fourth, Latzo battered through Loughran's guard and may have come close to flooring him in the fourth, but his attack faltered in the remaining rounds.  A rally in the ninth and tenth appeared to win the rounds for Latzo, but Loughran had continued to pile up points in the second half of the bout, and maintained enough of a margin to take the decision.

Latzo was soundly defeated by future world heavyweight champion Jim Braddock before a crowd of 4,000, on October 17, 1928, at New Jersey's Newark Armory in a ten-round points decision.  Braddock scored repeatedly with his left hook to the face and body, racking up points, and making it difficult for Latzo to mount much of an offense.  The club Doctor, after examining Latzo determined he had broken his jaw, apparently in the fourth round when Latzo had received a series of left hooks.  Latzo was down briefly in the ninth, and he was rocked by a hard right to the chin in the fifth.  Though Latzo was the pre-fight betting favorite, The Record of Hackensack, New Jersey, gave Braddock six rounds, with the first even and Latzo taking only the second, third, and fourth.  To recover from his jaw injury, according to several online boxing sites, Latzo did not fight competitively in 1929, except for a single bout in January.

Latzo defeated black boxer Larry Johnson in a close ten round points decision before 12,000 at Madison Square Garden on February 21, 1930.  Though the fighting was close, Johnson was unable to score often with his powerful right, and many ringside believed Latzo, scoring often with body shots, took at least one more round than his opponent. The Brooklyn Daily Eagle believed Johnson deserved the decision as Latzo's only real advantage was his excellent defense against Johnson, who had scored a string of consecutive knockouts before the match.  Latzo was required to crouch and let Johnson lead in most of the bout, as he was wary of Johnson's dangerous right, and had a disadvantage in reach of several inches.

Latzo fought Jimmy Slattery, former world light heavyweight champion, in a seven-round No Contest on May 27, 1930, at Boston Garden. The purses of both boxers were withheld and they were ordered to leave the ring by the referee when it appeared they were exerting too little effort to merit continuing.

In one of his last bouts on June 5, 1934, Latzo lost to Pennsylvania's state middleweight champion Teddy Yarosz in a fourth-round technical knockout in Millvale.  With a blow to the chin, Yarosz briefly dropped Latzo in the fourth for a one count which caused the referee to step in and end the bout.  Latzo protested the call to end the bout, but Yarosz had dominated much of the match, and had stunned him badly in the third.    Yarosz  would take the world middleweight championship only three months later.

Inspiration for Joe Palooka

Cartoonist Ham Fisher met Latzo outside a pool hall and, impressed by his personality, sportsmanship, and physique, was inspired to create his popular character Joe Palooka.  In the 1930s the strip appeared in more than 600 newspapers, had a readership around 50 million, and inspired several movies.

Life after boxing
Latzo left Scranton to reside in Marven Gardens, a suburb of Atlantic City, in Margate, NJ, near the end of his boxing career around 1928.

He found work as a welder during his boxing retirement, and pursued welding as a career until his death.  He was a visible figure at many of the affairs of the Veteran Boxer Association Ring #9 events around the state of New Jersey.  He was married to the former Catherine McHale, with whom he had a daughter.

He died at Atlantic City Hospital, after gall bladder surgery in July 1968, having suffered from gall bladder ailments since his boxing retirement.  His gall bladder issues may well have been a result of his boxing history as he was frequently the victim of brutal body blows to the stomach and both sides of his abdomen. He had had major surgery of some form in 1937 when he fist retired from boxing, and a boxing benefit was held for him in December of that year.   He was only sixty-six when he died.  His funeral was at Scranton, Pennsylvania's Holy Rosary Church on July 11, and he was buried in the city's Cathedral Cemetery, where his wife Catherine was laid to rest two years later.

Professional boxing record
All information in this section is derived from BoxRec, unless otherwise stated.

Official record

All newspaper decisions are officially regarded as “no decision” bouts and are not counted to the win/loss/draw column.

Unofficial record

Record with the inclusion of newspaper decisions to the win/loss/draw column.

See also
List of welterweight boxing champions

References

External links
 

|-

 

 https://boxrec.com/media/index.php/The_Ring_Magazine%27s_Annual_Ratings:_Welterweight--1920s
 https://titlehistories.com/boxing/na/usa/ny/nysac-lh.html
 https://boxrec.com/media/index.php/The_Ring_Magazine%27s_Annual_Ratings:_Light_Heavyweight--1920s
 https://titlehistories.com/boxing/na/usa/ny/nysac-wl.html
 https://titlehistories.com/boxing/wba/wba-world-wl.html

1902 births
1968 deaths
Welterweight boxers
World welterweight boxing champions
World boxing champions
Boxers from Pennsylvania
American people of Italian descent
American people of Slovak descent
American male boxers